The University of Winnipeg Collegiate, also commonly called The Collegiate, is a private, university-preparatory high school. Founded in 1873 within Wesley College, The Collegiate is the oldest high school in the province of Manitoba. The school is located in downtown Winnipeg on the University of Winnipeg campus.

Admissions 

There is limited enrollment for grade 9 (45 students), grade 10 (60 students), grade 11 (75 students), and grade 12 (135 students). Because of the limited enrollment for grade 9 and 10, all applicants are required to meet with The Collegiate Dean for an interview.

The U of W Collegiate has had a recent influx of new students, particularly in the grade 9, because of its new popularity.

Academics 

The Collegiate's academic programme is university preparatory; the curriculum is based on Manitoba Ministry of Education standards. The academic year follows closely with the University of Winnipeg's, which gives Collegiate students the opportunity to experience a pace consistent with University.

Faculty and Staff 

The school is administered by Dean Dr. Kevin Clace with Associate Dean Osaed Khan. The previous Dean, Robert Bend, retired after the 2017/2018 academic year. There are 32 faculty members in total, 28 of which teach at the school and 16 of which hold advanced degrees.

Campus

Wesley Hall

Wesley Hall is located at the south end of the University of Winnipeg campus, facing Portage Avenue. The four-floor stone 'sand castle' serves as the primary academic facility for The Collegiate, which is also the flagship building for the University of Winnipeg. The landmark sandstone building, sometimes referred to as the 'castle', underwent extensive renovations which were completed in 2006. The renovations on the heritage building, which totaled well over $7.5 million, had focused primarily on the stone exterior, which had been heavily worn down over the century. The renovations also included the installation of new windows and replacement of the roof. The administrative offices of the Dean of The Collegiate and admission services are located on the 1st floor of Wesley Hall, after being moved from the 2nd floor in the summer of 2008. Tony's Cafeteria was formerly located on the main floor, but was closed in the summer of 2008 to make room for more classrooms. Thanks to a donation from the family of Dr. Douglas Leatherdale, a new Tony's Cafeteria and Leatherdale Commons (Leatherdale Hall) was completed for the 2017/18 academic year.

Manitoba Hall

Manitoba Hall is north of Sparling Hall, the building is primarily composed of chemistry labs and classrooms. A few first and second-floor classrooms are used for Collegiate classes during the academic year.

Sparling Hall

Sparling Hall is located north and west of Wesley Hall. Most Collegiate activities take place in Wesley Hall, however classes at the school are also taught at Sparling Hall and Manitoba Hall. Sparling also houses the Aurora Family Therapy Centre and Technology Solutions Centre.

Centennial Hall

Centennial Hall is a four-storey building that houses the University of Winnipeg's library on the fourth-floor. Collegiate students have full access to the university library catalogue.

Notable alumni 
 David Asper, Vice-President of CanWest Global Communications Corp.
 Luke Doucet, Songwriter, Musician
 Jeff Golfman, businessman
 Geoff Gray, football player
 Wab Kinew, Musician, Broadcaster and Politician
 Chantal Kreviazuk, Singer-Songwriter
 Ash Modha, CEO of Mondetta

External links 
 University of Winnipeg Collegiate Website

References

University of Winnipeg
High schools in Winnipeg
Private schools in Manitoba
Preparatory schools in Manitoba
Educational institutions established in 1873
1873 establishments in Manitoba
Schools in downtown Winnipeg